Gloria Gordon Bolotsky (July 28, 1921 – June 30, 2009) was an American computer scientist, one of the early programmers of the ENIAC computer.

Early life
Gloria Ruth Gordon was born in New York City. She attended a nursing school, but eventually graduated with a degree in mathematics from Brooklyn College.

She married her husband, Max Bolotsky, a metallurgist, in 1948. They raised their family in Rockville, Maryland. They had five daughters.

Career
Gordon worked at the Brooklyn Navy Yard as a mathematician before moving to Philadelphia to join the University of Pennsylvania's engineering school in the 1940s. She was part of a team of around a hundred scientists who participated in the programming of the ENIAC computer, which was designed to calculate artillery firing tables for the US Army. The initial programming had been done by six women.

In 1946, Life magazine published a photograph of the ENIAC with two women working on it. Although the women were not identified at the time, the woman crouching was later revealed to be Gordon, while the other one was co-worker Ester Gerston.

From Philadelphia, she was hired to a secret group at the Aberdeen Proving Ground in Maryland in 1947. In the 1950s, Gloria Bolotsky worked as a high school mathematics teacher in Towson for a year. In 1963, she joined the National Bureau of Standards in Gaithersburg, where she worked for the next twenty years. Her contributions included computer networking, embedding networks in telecommunications systems, and cost optimization techniques.

Later life
Gloria Bolotsky's husband died in 1998 after forty-nine years of marriage. She died of cancer on June 30, 2009 in Gaithersburg, Maryland. She was interred at King David Memorial Gardens, Falls Church, Virginia.

Selected publications

References

Further reading
 
 

1921 births
2009 deaths
People from Brooklyn
Brooklyn College alumni
American computer scientists
American women computer scientists
20th-century American women scientists
20th-century American scientists
Scientists from New York (state)
20th-century American mathematicians
20th-century women mathematicians
American women mathematicians
21st-century American women